Transcription factor SOX-10 is a protein that in humans is encoded by the SOX10 gene.

Function 
This gene encodes a member of the SOX (SRY-related HMG-box) family of transcription factors involved in the regulation of embryonic development and determination of cell fate. The encoded protein acts as a transcriptional activator after forming a protein complex with other proteins. This protein acts as a nucleocytoplasmic shuttle protein and is important for neural crest and peripheral nervous system development.

In melanocytic cells, there is evidence that SOX10 gene expression may be regulated by MITF.

Mutations 
Mutations in this gene are associated with Waardenburg–Shah syndrome and uveal melanoma.

Immunostain
SOX10 is used as an immunohistochemistry marker, being positive in:
Neuroectodermal neoplasms of neural crest origin, especially:
Melanoma, although desmoplastic melanomas may be only focally positive.
Nevus

Interactions 

The interaction between SOX10 and PAX3 is studied best in human patients with Waardenburg syndrome, an autosomal dominant disorder that is divided into four different types based upon mutations in additional genes. SOX10 and PAX3 interactions are thought to be regulators of other genes involved in the symptoms of Waardenburg syndrome, particularly MITF, which influences the development of melanocytes as well as neural crest formation. MITF expression can be transactivated by both SOX10 and PAX3 to have an additive effect. The two genes have binding sites near one another on the upstream enhancer of the c-RET gene. SOX10 is also thought to target dopachrome tautomerase through a synergistic interaction with MITF, which then results in other melanocyte alteration.

SOX10 can influence the generation of Myelin Protein Zero (MPZ) transcription through its interactions with proteins such as OLIG1 and EGR2, which is important for the functionality of neurons. Other cofactors have been identified, such as SP1, OCT6, NMI, FOXD3 and SOX2.

The interaction between SOX10 and NMI seems to be coexpressed in glial cells, gliomas, and the spinal cord and has been shown to modulate the transcriptional activity of SOX10.

See also 
 SOX genes
List of histologic stains that aid in diagnosis of cutaneous conditions

References

Further reading

External links 
 

Transcription factors